Asoprisnil ecamate (INN) (developmental code name J-956) is a synthetic, steroidal selective progesterone receptor modulator (SPRM) which was under development for the treatment of endometriosis, uterine fibroids, and menopausal symptoms but was discontinued. It is a potent and highly selective ligand of the progesterone receptor with mixed agonistic and antagonistic activity and much reduced antiglucocorticoid activity relative to mifepristone. The drug reached phase III clinical trials for the aforementioned indications prior to its discontinuation.

See also
 Asoprisnil
 Ulipristal acetate
 Vilaprisan

References

External links
 Asoprisnil ecamate – AdisInsight

Antiglucocorticoids
Oxime carbamates
Estranes
Imines
Enones
Selective progesterone receptor modulators
Steroid oximes